Barreirinhas is a municipality in the state of Maranhão in the Northeast region of Brazil.

The municipality contains part of the  Upaon-Açu/Miritiba/Alto Preguiças Environmental Protection Area, created in 1992.

Transport 
The locality is served by the Barreirinhas Airport.

See also
List of municipalities in Maranhão

References

External links

Municipalities in Maranhão
Populated coastal places in Maranhão